Massachusetts's 14th congressional district is an obsolete district which was in eastern Massachusetts and the Maine District.  It was eliminated in 1963 after the 1960 U.S. Census.  Its last Congressman was Joseph William Martin, Jr., who was redistricted into the 10th district.

Cities and towns in the district

1790s-1810s

1910s
"Bristol County: Town of Easton. Norfolk County: City of Quincy; towns of Avon, Braintree, Canton, Dedham, Foxboro, Holbrook, Milton, Norwood, Randolph, Sharon,
Stoughton, Westwood, and Weymouth. Plymouth County: City of Brockton; towns of Abington, Rockland, East Bridgewater, West Bridgewater, and Whitman." Suffolk County: Boston (Ward 26).

1920s-1960s

List of members representing the district

References

 Congressional Biographical Directory of the United States 1774–present
 

14
Former congressional districts of the United States
1963 disestablishments in Massachusetts
Constituencies established in 1795
Constituencies disestablished in 1963
1795 establishments in Massachusetts